Dansk Folkepartis Ungdom (Youth of the Danish People's Party) is the youth wing of the Danish People's Party.

External links 
 DFU website

Youth wings of political parties in Denmark
Youth wings of conservative parties